The Women's pentathlon event  at the 2011 European Athletics Indoor Championships was held at March 4.

Records

Results

60 m hurdles 
The heats were held at 9:00.

High jump
The event was held at 9:55.

Shot Put 
The event was held at 12:15.

Long Jump 
The event was held at 15:45.

800m 
The heats were held at 18:22.

Final standings

References 

Combined events at the European Athletics Indoor Championships
2011 European Athletics Indoor Championships
2011 in women's athletics